Rickey Norman Bustle (born August 23, 1953) is an American football coach and former player. He is the Head football coach at Athens Christian School in Athens, Georgia, a position he had held since 2021. Bustle served as the head football coach at the University of Louisiana at Lafayette from 2002 to 2010, compiling a record of 41–65. As a player Bustle was a three-year football letterman at Clemson University. Before going to Louisiana, Bustle was an assistant coach (offensive coordinator and quarterbacks coach) at Virginia Tech. Bustle's salary at Louisiana in 2009 was $226,000.

Head coaching record

College

References

1953 births
Living people
American football wide receivers
Clemson Tigers football players
East Carolina Pirates football coaches
Gardner–Webb Runnin' Bulldogs football coaches
Louisiana Ragin' Cajuns football coaches
Louisiana–Monroe Warhawks football coaches
North Carolina A&T Aggies football coaches
South Carolina Gamecocks football coaches
Southern Miss Golden Eagles football coaches
Tulane Green Wave football coaches
Virginia Tech Hokies football coaches
United States Football League coaches
High school football coaches in Georgia (U.S. state)
Sportspeople from Charleston, South Carolina
People from Summerville, South Carolina
Coaches of American football from South Carolina
Players of American football from South Carolina